The Aruba Marriott Resort & Stellaris Casino is a hotel and casino resort along the northwestern beach of Aruba.  It opened with the hotel and casino in 1995.

References

External links

Information on ArubaHotel.com

 

Hotels in Aruba
1990s establishments in the Netherlands Antilles
Marriott hotels
Hotels established in 1995
Hotel buildings completed in 1995
Buildings and structures in Noord
20th-century architecture in the Netherlands